Dr. Carole Berotte Joseph is a former educator and administrator who served as the first Haitian-born United States college president and the first woman president of Massachusetts Bay Community College. She was born in Port-au-Prince and raised in Brooklyn, New York. She migrated to the U.S. at the age of 8 in 1957 and is fluent in four languages – English, Haitian Creole, Spanish and French. She holds a Bachelor's degree in Spanish and education from the City University of New York (CUNY). She earned her Master's degree in curriculum, teaching and bilingual education at Fordham University and her PhD in bilingual education and sociolinguistics at NYU in 1992. She was the President of Bronx Community College in New York from 2011 to 2014.

At least one critic called Joseph's time at Massachusetts Bay Community College the “reign of terror," according to the professional journal Inside Higher Ed.

References

1949 births
Living people
Fordham University alumni
City University of New York alumni
New York University alumni
People from Port-au-Prince
Bronx Community College faculty